Rudarius ercodes, the whitespotted pygmy filefish, is a species of reef filefish in the family Monacanthidae. It is a small fish, growing to only 5 cm (2 in), and is found in the temperate waters of Japan. It is kept in captivity and has been successfully captive bred.

References
 

Monacanthidae
Fish of East Asia
Fish described in 1902